Numbur is a glaciated mountain located in the Rolwaling Himal mountain range of Nepal.

Climbing history
The Numbur was first climbed on May 29, 1963 by Hiroshi Matsuo and Mingma Tserin, participants of a Japanese expedition, from the south face.

In October 1981 a French expedition succeeded in the alleged first ascent of Numbur from the southwest ridge. Jean-Pierre Henry, Christian Rathat and Mingma Sherpa reached the summit on October 14, Eric Laroche, Jean-François Le Quang and Philippe Veyrac followed on October 17.

References

External links

Mountains of Koshi Province
Mountains of the Bagmati Province